The 2020 PDC Unicorn Development Tour were a series of events that were part of the 2020 PDC Pro Tour.

Having originally been scheduled to be 20 events, following the COVID-19 pandemic, the tour was reduced to just 10 events in 2020.

The top 2 players on the rankings would earn a PDC Tour Card and qualify for the 2021 PDC World Darts Championship.

Prize money
The prize money for the Development Tour events remained the same from 2019, with each event having a prize fund of £10,000.

This is how the prize money is divided:

February

Development Tour 1
Development Tour 1 was contested on Saturday 29 February 2020 at Halle 39 in Hildesheim.

Development Tour 2
Development Tour 2 was contested on Saturday 29 February 2020 at Halle 39 in Hildesheim.

March

Development Tour 3
Development Tour 3 was contested on Sunday 1 March 2020 at Halle 39 in Hildesheim.

Development Tour 4
Development Tour 4 was contested on Sunday 1 March 2020 at Halle 39 in Hildesheim.

September

Development Tour 5
Development Tour 5 was contested on Friday 25 September 2020 at the Barnsley Metrodome in Barnsley.

Development Tour 6
Development Tour 6 was contested on Friday 25 September 2020 at the Barnsley Metrodome in Barnsley.

Development Tour 7
Development Tour 7 was contested on Saturday 26 September 2020 at the Barnsley Metrodome in Barnsley.

Development Tour 8
Development Tour 8 was contested on Saturday 26 September 2020 at the Barnsley Metrodome in Barnsley.

Development Tour 9
Development Tour 9 was contested on Sunday 27 September 2020 at the Barnsley Metrodome in Barnsley.

Development Tour 10
Development Tour 10 was contested on Sunday 27 September 2020 at the Barnsley Metrodome in Barnsley.

References

2020 in darts
2020 PDC Pro Tour